KEXO is a radio station serving Grand Junction, Colorado and vicinity with a sports talk format affiliated with ESPN. This station broadcasts on a frequency of 1230 kHz AM and is under ownership of Townsquare Media.

History
KEXO began broadcasting February 29, 1948, on 1230 kHz with 250 W power (full-time). It was licensed to Voice of Western Colorado.

Later, power was raised to 1000 watts days, but returned to 250 watts at sunset. Studios were located in a downtown storefront, with news wire machines facing the street, and an observation window where pedestrians could watch the DJ at work. KEXO's former studios were located on North 25th Street in Grand Junction from 1948 until 1963. In 1963, KEXO's studios were relocated after their own former studios were demolished by a fire. The station was a Top 40 station for Grand Junction for many years, which then turned to adult contemporary in the mid to late 1970s. "Music & More 1230 KEXO" was its slogan. On January 18, 2021, KEXO began simulcasting on 96.5 FM via translator K243CP.

References

External links
FCC History Cards for KEXO

Cumulus Grand Junction
La Maquina Musical Website
KEXO website

EXO
Regional Mexican radio stations in the United States
Talk radio stations in the United States
Radio stations established in 1975
Townsquare Media radio stations